Lentibacillus jeotgali is a  Gram-positive, endospore-forming, moderately halophilic and non-motile bacterium from the genus of Lentibacillus which has been isolated from fermented seafood.

References

Bacillaceae
Bacteria described in 2010